The 2006 Anchorage mayoral election was held on April 4, 2006, to elect the mayor of Anchorage, Alaska. It saw reelection of Mark Begich.

Since Begich had received more than a 45% plurality of the vote, no runoff was necessary.

Candidates
Mark Begich, incumbent mayor and former Anchorage Assemblyman
Jack Frost, local media broadcast personality and 2000 mayoral candidate
Thomas Mark Higgins, 2003 mayoral candidate
Nick Moe

Results

References 

Anchorage
Anchorage 
2006
Mark Begich